This is an alphabetical list of articles pertaining specifically to Engineering Science and Mechanics (ESM). For a broad overview of engineering, please see Engineering.  For biographies please see List of engineers and Mechanicians.

A
Acceleration –
Accelerometer –
Accuracy and precision – 
Adhesive bonds –
Adhesives –
Aerodynamics –
Aeroelasticity –
Aerospace engineering –
Aircraft –
American Association for the Advancement of Science –
American Institute of Aeronautics and Astronautics –
American Physical Society –
Ampere –
Applied mathematics –
Applied mechanics – 
Archimedes' screw –  
Armor –
Artificial intelligence –
Atmospheric turbulence –
Automobile –  
Axle –

B
Beams –
Bending – 
Biodynamic agriculture – 
Biomaterials – 
Biomechanical stability – 
Biomechanics – 
Biomechatronics – 
Biomedical engineering –
Biomimetic – 
Brittle – 
Buckling –

C
CAD –
CAID –
Calculator – 
Calculus –
Car handling – 
Carbon fiber – 
Chaos theory –
Civil engineering –
Classical mechanics –  
Clean room design –
Combustion –
Complex systems –
Composite material –  
Compression ratio –  
Compressive strength –
Computational fluid dynamics – 
Computational mechanics – 
Computer – 
Computer-aided design –
Conservation of mass – 
Constant-velocity joint –  
Constraint – 
Continuum mechanics –
Control theory –
Corrosion –

D
Deformation –
Delamination – 
Design –
Deterministic –
Differential equation –
Dimensionless number –
Direct numerical simulation – 
Durability –
Dynamical system –
Dynamics –
Dynamic response –

E
Earthquake engineering –
Elasticity – 
Electric motor – 
Electrical engineering – 
Electrical circuit –
Electrical network –
Electromagnetism – 
Engineering –
Engineering education –
Engineering economics –
Engineering ethics – 
Engineering fundamentals – 
Engineering physics – 
Engineering science – 
Engineering society –
Experimental mechanics –

F

Factor of safety –
False precision – 
Fracture –
Fatigue –  
Ferrofluid –
Filter (large eddy simulation) –
Finite element analysis –
Fluid dynamics –
Fluid structure interaction –
Force –
Force density –
Friction –
Functionally graded material –
Fundamentals of Engineering exam –
Fusion deposition modelling –

G
Gasdynamics –
Gear – 
Granular material –

H

Higher-order statistical analysis –
Hooke's law –  
Hydraulics –
Hydrostatics –
Hypersonic –

I
Impact mechanics –
Inclined plane – 
Inertia – 
Infrastructure health monitoring –
Instrumentation –
International Union of Theoretical and Applied Mechanics –
Invention –

J
Joule –

K
Kelvin –
Kinematics –

L
Large eddy simulation –
Laser –
Lattice Boltzmann methods –
Leadership –
Lever – 
Life-cycle cost analysis –
Lubrication –

M
Machine – 
Mass transfer –
Materials –
Materials behavior –
Materials engineering –
Materials science –
Mechanical efficiency –  
Mechanical equilibrium – 
Mechanical work – 
Mechanics –
Mechanics of materials –
MEMS – 
Microfluidics –
Micromachinery – 
Micromechanics –
Mineral engineering –
Mining engineering –
Molecular assembler – 
Molecular dynamics – 
Molecular mechanics – 
Molecular nanotechnology –
Moment – 
Moment of inertia –
Multi-link suspension –
Multifunctional materials –
Multiphysics problems –
Multiscale analysis –

N
Nanoscience –
Nanotechnology –
Nanoelectromechanical system (NEMS) – 
Neuromuscular control –
Nondestructive evaluation –
Nonlinear elasticity –
Nonlinear dynamics –
Nonlinear wave –
Normal stress –  
Nozzle –

O
Ocean engineering –

P

Pascal –
Penetration dynamics –
Perturbation methods –
Physics –
Pinion – 
Piston –
Plasticity –  
Pneumatics –
Poisson's ratio – 
Position vector – 
Potential difference –
Power – 
Pressure –
Prime mover – 
Probabilistic mechanics –
Probabilistic methods –
Process control – 
Professional engineer –
Project management –
Pulley –
Pump –

Q
Quality – 
Quality control –

R
Rack and pinion – 
Reacting flow –
Rear wheel drive –
Refrigeration –  
Reliability engineering – 
Reverse engineering –
Rheology – 
Rigid body – 
Robotics –
Rolling –

S

Safety engineering – 
Self assembly –
Semiconductor –
Sensors –
Series and parallel circuits –
Shear strength – 
Shear stress – 
Shells –
Shock waves –
Simple machine –
Simulation –
Soft matter –
Soft tissue –
Solid mechanics –
Solid modeling –
Statics –
Statistical analysis –
Stochastic methods –
Stress-strain curve – 
Structural failure – 
Structural vibration – 
Student design competition –
Superfluid hydrodynamics –
Supersonic –
Suspension –

T
Technology –
Tensile strength – 
Tensile stress –
Theoretical mechanics –
Theory of elasticity –
Thermodynamics –
Thermomagnetic convection –
Torque – 
Torsion spring – 
Toughness –
Transport phenomena –
Turbine –
Tribology –

U

Unsprung weight –

V
Validation –
Valve –  
Vector –
Vertical strength –
Vibration – 
Viscosity – 
Viscoelasticity –
Volt –
Vortex dynamics –

W
Wave mechanics –
Wave propagation –
Water waves –
Wear –
Work (physics) -

X

Y
Yield strength – 
Young's modulus –

Z

Engineering science and mechanics topics